Attorney General Hammond may refer to:

Hall Hammond (1902–1991), Attorney General of Maryland
Nathaniel Job Hammond (1833–1899), Attorney General of Georgia

See also
General Hammond (disambiguation)